An interest group or an advocacy group is a body which uses various forms of advocacy in order to influence public opinion and/or policy.

Interest group may also refer to:

 Learned society
 Special interest group, a group of individuals sharing specialist knowledge
 University society

See also
 Special Interest, a New Orleans punk band
 
 
 Advocacy
 Lobbying